Donald Paul McCaslin (born August 11, 1966) is an American jazz saxophonist. He has recorded over a dozen albums as a bandleader in addition to many sideman appearances, including on David Bowie's final studio album, Blackstar (2016).

Early life
McCaslin was born in Santa Clara, California, on August 11, 1966. His father was a vibraphonist, and McCaslin played in his father's ensemble at the age of twelve. He had his own group in high school, which played three years at the Monterey Jazz Festival.

Musical career

In 1987, after studying at Berklee College of Music, McCaslin joined Gary Burton's group and toured the world with him for four years. In 1991 he moved to New York City and was a member of Steps Ahead.

In November 2014, McCaslin played saxophone on David Bowie's single "Sue (Or in a Season of Crime)". Subsequently he would play saxophone on Bowie's 2016 album Blackstar.

On October 14, 2016, McCaslin released Beyond Now, inspired by his experience recording Blackstar. The album features the same band that appeared on Blackstar - Tim Lefebvre on bass, Jason Lindner on keyboards, and Mark Guiliana on drums. The album includes two Bowie covers, as well as covers of MUTEMATH, Deadmau5, and The Chainsmokers, plus five original tracks.

NPR's All Songs Considered called McCaslin's "What About the Body" single "exhilarating art-rock". The album it came from, Blow, was awarded New Jazz Album of the Year by JazzJapan.

Grammy nominations
 2004: Best Jazz Instrumental Solo – "Bulería, Soleá Y Rumba" on  Concert in the Garden by Maria Schneider
 2013: Best Improvised Jazz Solo – "Stadium Jazz" on Casting for Gravity
 2015: Best Improvised Jazz Solo – "Arbiters of Evolution" on The Thompson Fields by Maria Schneider

Discography

As leader

 Exile and Discovery (Naxos, 1998)
 Seen from Above (Arabesque, 2000)
 The Way Through (Arabesque, 2003)
 Soar (Sunnyside, 2006)
 Give and Go (Criss Cross Jazz, 2006)
 In Pursuit (Sunnyside, 2007)
 Recommended Tools (Greenleaf, 2008)
 Declaration (Sunnyside, 2009)
 Perpetual Motion (Greenleaf, 2010)
 Casting for Gravity (Greenleaf, 2012)
 Fast Future (Greenleaf, 2015)
 Beyond Now (Motéma, 2016)
 Blow. (Motéma, 2018)
  Jong Metropole Orkest (Rotterdam 2022)

Collaborations
With Lan Xang
 Lan Xang with David Binney, Scott Colley, Jeff Hirschfield (1998)
 Hidden Gardens with David Binney, Scott Colley, Kenny Wolensen (2000)

With Dave Douglas
 Meaning and Mystery (Greenleaf, 2006)
 Live at the Jazz Standard (Greenleaf, 2007)

With The Maria Schneider Jazz Orchestra
 Concert in the Garden (ArtistShare, 2004)
 Sky Blue (ArtistShare, 2007)
 The Thompson Fields (ArtistShare, 2015)

With David Bowie
 "Sue (Or in a Season of Crime)" (ISO, 2015)
 Blackstar (ISO, 2016)
 No Plan (Columbia, 2017)

As sideman
 Tyler Collins, Tyler (RCA, 1992)
 Bruno Raberg, Pentimento (Boston Skyline, 1992)
 Terence Trent D'Arby, Terence Trent D'Arby's Symphony or Damn (Columbia, 1993)
 Tia Carrere, Dream (Reprise, 1993)
 Nokko, Call Me Nightlife (Epic, 1993)
 Nokko, I Will Catch U (Sony, 1993)
 Virgil Moorefield, Distractions On the Way to the King's Party (Cuneiform, 1994)
 Steps Ahead, Vibe (NYC, 1995)
 Scott Colley, Portable Universe (Free Lance, 1996)
 Rachel Z, Room of One's Own (NYC, 1996)
 Hector Martignon, Portrait in White and Black (Candid, 1996)
 Roberta Piket, Unbroken Line (Criss Cross, 1997)
 Hector Martignon, The Foreign Affair (Candid, 1998)
 Reuben Wilson, Organ Donor (Jazzateria, 1998)
 Ken Schaphorst Big Band, Purple (Naxos, 1999)
 Luis Bonilla, Escucha! (Candid, 2000)
 New York Voices, Sing! Sing! Sing! (Concord Jazz, 2001)
 David Binney, Balance (ACT, 2002)
 Tony Monaco, Master Chops T (Summit, 2002)
 Alex Sipiagin, Mirrors (Criss Cross, 2002)
 Steve Hass, Traveler (Hassbeat, 2003)
 Danilo Perez, Till Then (Verve, 2003)
 George Schuller, Round 'Bout Now (Playscape, 2003)
 Luciana Souza, North and South (Limited Edition 2003)
 Ethan Winogrand, Made in Brooklyn (Clean Feed, 2003)
 Hans Glawischnig, Common Ground (Fresh Sound, 2004)
 Bruno Raberg, Chrysalis (OrbisMusic, 2004)
 Fahir Atakoglu, If (Far & Here, 2005)
 Luis Bonilla, Trombonilla: Terminal Clarity (Now Jazz Consortium, 2005)
 Gene Ess, Sandbox and Sanctum (Simp, 2005)
 Matthias Lupri, Metalix (Summit, 2006)
 Torben Waldorff, Brilliance (Artistshare, 2006)
 Kenichi Doami, Chronicle (2007)
 Alex Sipiagin, Out of the Circle (ArtistShare, 2007)
 Kate McGarry, If Less Is More (Palmetto, 2008)
 George Schuller, Like Before Somewhat After (Playscape, 2008)
 Gary Versace, Outside In (Criss Cross, 2008)
 Torben Waldorff, Afterburn (Artistshare, 2008)
 Julie Lamontagne Trio, Now What (Justin Time, 2009)
 Dave Lisik, Coming Through Slaughter: The Bolden Legend (SkyDeck Music, 2009)
 Geggie Trio, Across the Sky (Plunge, 2010)
 Bobby McFerrin, Vocabularies (Emarcy, 2010)
 Torben Waldorff, American Rock Beauty (Artistshare, 2010)
 Joel Harrison, Search (Sunnyside, 2011)
 Ethan Winogrand, Half Full (Every Good Song, 2011)
 Marshall Gilkes, Sound Stories (Alternate Side, 2012)
 Hutchinson Andrew Trio, Prairie Modern (Chronograph, 2013)
 Samo Salamon, Stretching Out (Samo, 2013)
 Antonio Sánchez, New Life (CAM Jazz, 2013)
 Thana Alexa, Ode to Heroes (Jazz Village, 2014)
 Alon Nechushtan, Venture Bound (Enja, 2014)
 Kenny Carr, Idle Talk (CDBaby, 2014)
 Dave Lisik, Machaut Man and a Superman Hat (Rattle, 2014)
 Pavel Wlosok Trio,  Alternate Reality (CDBaby, 2014)
 Enrico Pieranunzi, Proximity (CAM Jazz, 2015)
 Monkey House, Left (Alma, 2016)
 Enrico Pieranunzi, New Spring (CAM Jazz, 2016)
 WinterFisch Quartet, Timeless (Jazz Sick, 2016)
 Julian & Roman Wasserfuhr, Landed in Brooklyn (ACT, 2017)
 Art Hirahara, Central Line (Posi-Tone, 2017)
 Art Hirahara, Sunward Bound (Posi-Tone, 2018)
 Michael Leonhart, The Painted Lady Suite (Sunnyside, 2018)
 Sun Kil Moon, I Also Want to Die in New Orleans'' (Caldo Verde, 2019)

References

External links
Official site

American jazz saxophonists
American male saxophonists
Musicians from Santa Cruz, California
1966 births
Living people
Berklee College of Music alumni
Arabesque Records artists
Criss Cross Jazz artists
21st-century American saxophonists
Jazz musicians from California
21st-century American male musicians
American male jazz musicians
Steps Ahead members
Motéma Music artists
Sunnyside Records artists